Anglars-Saint-Félix (Languedocien: Anglars de Rinhac) is a commune in the Aveyron department in the Occitanie region of southern France.

The inhabitants of the commune are known as Anglélixois or Anglélixoises

Geography
Anglars-Saint-Félix is located some 20 km north-east of Villefranche-de-Rouergue and 30 km west by north-west of Rodez. It can be accessed by road D1 from Lanuéjouls to the village which then continues to the eastern border of the commune where it changes to the D994 and continues east to Rodez. There is also the D61 road from Prévinquières in the south to the village then continuing north to join the D994 west of Roussennac. The D156 also goes from the village to Privezac in the west. Apart from the village there are also the hamlets of:

Anglares
Aubignac
La Bezonie
La Bonnaurie
Le Bruel
La Carreyrie
Lespeliguie
Linrezie
La Remise
Revel
Saint-Felix
Segala
Le Tronc

The rest of the commune is entirely farmland.

The commune is traversed by the Alzou river through the centre from east to west. Many tributaries join the Alzou including the Ruisseau de la Besade from the north, the Ruisseau de Filloise and the Ruisseau de Carbonnieres from the south.

Neighbouring communes and villages

Administration
List of Successive Mayors

Mayors from 1929

Population

Sites and Monuments
The Church of Saint Clair has three items that are registered as historical objects:
A Baptismal font (17th century) 
A Stoup (17th century) 
A Cabinet for the baptismal font (17th century)

Cultural events and festivities
The village fair is held on the first Sunday of June.

For 23 years, as part of its votive festival, the village of Anglars has transformed into a living museum. 250 extras dress at this time for an afternoon to reenact life a century ago. There is also the revival of old crafts, scenes of life, typical characters in the life of a village, teams of oxen, horses, baking bread etc. To see this reconstruction viewers move through the village from scene to scene and at any time can become actors. Admission is free.

In 2013 about 7,000 people came to the festival with 5,000 on the Sunday. Each time of year had its activities: haymaking and threshing in summer; cider, chestnuts and corn in the autumn; in the evening: frittons and hemp work in winter, sheep shearing and Palm Sunday blessings in spring. Fifty skits depict these events and also old trades and essential works that are made every year. The musical program is varied throughout the weekend: traditional dancing and a concert with Brick a drac (Festive Occitan) on Friday, banda and dancing with the band Utopia (variety rock) on Saturday, and Escloupeto (folk group) accordion orchestra with David Firmin and a recital by Andre Roques (the author of "My Aveyron") with their singer on Sunday. All concerts are free including the show on Sunday.

See also
Communes of the Aveyron department

References

External links
Photos from the 18th Anglars Fair (2008) 
Anglars-Saint-Félix on the National Geographic Institute website 
Anglars-Saint-Félix on Géoportail, National Geographic Institute (IGN) website 
Anglars and St. Felix de Rignac on the 1750 Cassini Map

Communes of Aveyron